Eyre Saitch (February 20, 1905 in Pembroke Parish, Bermuda – November 28, 1985 in New Jersey) was an American professional basketball player. He was a member of the New York Renaissance basketball team, and part of the first black team to win a world championship in basketball. He would win over 2000 games with the team. He along with his team was enshrined in the Naismith Memorial Basketball Hall of Fame. Erye was a national level tennis player who would win a national title in tennis. Erye died in 1985. He won a 1926 American Tennis Association singles title. Sylvester Smith served as Saitch's doubles partner.  During his career he was also known as Bruiser Saitch.

References

1905 births
1985 deaths
American male tennis players
New York Renaissance players
People from Pembroke Parish
20th-century African-American sportspeople
Bermudian emigrants to the United States